The Goal is a management-oriented novel by Eliyahu M. Goldratt, a business consultant known for his theory of constraints, and Jeff Cox, the author of several management-oriented novels. The Goal was originally published in 1984 and has since been revised and republished.  This describes a case study in operations management, focusing on the theory of constraints, and bottlenecks and how to alleviate them. In 2011, Time Magazine listed the book as one of "the 25 most influential business management books".

Setting
Like other books by Goldratt and by Cox, The Goal is written as a piece of fiction. The main character is Alex Rogo, who manages a production plant with an uncertain future. Bill Peach, a company executive, tells Alex that he has three months to turn operations at his plant around from being unprofitable and unreliable to being successful. Jonah (a physicist), whom many believe represents Goldratt himself, helps him solve the company's problems through a series of telephone calls and short meetings wherein he explains many fundamental business concepts. A second story line is introduced involving Alex's marital life.

Bottlenecks
The book goes on to point out the role of bottlenecks (constraints) in a manufacturing process, and how identifying them not only makes it possible to reduce their impact, but also yields a useful tool for measuring and controlling the flow of materials. Alex and his team identify the bottlenecks in their process and immediately begin to implement changes to help increase capacity and speed up production. In response to questions about the logic of using outdated technology in modern manufacturing, Alex's team brought in an old machine they received for free (which had previously been used at their plant in conjunction with two other machines) in order to increase the capacity of the NCX-10 machine, which had been identified as one of the two bottlenecks. Further more, they identified processes at the heat treat, identified as their second bottleneck, that caused massive delays in their getting product through the heat-treat and which had also caused some products to be heat-treated multiple times (to make softer and then harder again) instead of just once or not at all.

Socratic method
In the book, Jonah teaches Alex Rogo by using the Socratic method. Throughout the book, whenever a meeting or telephone call dialogue happens with Jonah, he poses a question to Alex Rogo or a member of his crew, which in turn causes them to talk amongst themselves to come up with a solution to their problem. When Alex Rogo is with his wife, he finds the Socratic method to be a way to fix his marriage, which he then uses, with his crew, to come up with the five steps they should use to fix problems in the plant, which ultimately leads him and Lou to think up the three things every division manager, the position Rogo is promoted to, should be able to do.

Characters
 Alex Rogo – main character, manufacturing plant manager, hero of the story
 Bill Peach – division vice-president
 Fran – Alex's secretary
 Jonah – advisor, Alex's former physics professor
 Lou – chief accountant / plant controller
 Stacey – inventory manager
 Julie Rogo – Alex Rogo's wife
 Bob Donovan – production manager
 Ralph Nakamura – data processing manager
 Herbie – the bottleneck and the solution
 Dave – Alex Rogo's son
 Sharon – Alex Rogo's daughter
 Mike O'Donnel – union rep
 Ethan Frost – division controller
 Johnny Jons – marketing director / sales manager
 Hilton Smyth – assistant division controller
 Bucky Burnside – President of UniCo's biggest customer

See also

List of project management topics
List of management topics

References

Editions

External links
 Chapter-wise summary of The Goal at the Theory of Constraints Institute website

1984 novels
Theory of constraints
Business fables
Leadership
Marketing books